Syrnola attenuata is a species of sea snail, a marine gastropod mollusk in the family Pyramidellidae, the pyrams and their allies.

Description
The whitish shell is slender and shining. The length of the shell measures 11.5 mm.  It is finely spirally striated. The whorls of the teleoconch are flattened. The suture is profound.

Distribution
This marine species is found off the Philippines.

References

External links

Pyramidellidae
Gastropods described in 1892